The 2017 NCAA Division I women's soccer season was the 36th season of NCAA women's college soccer. The USC Trojans were the defending national champions.

Preseason

Coaching changes

Conference realignment
Three schools joined new conferences this season. Two moved their entire athletic programs to new conferences, and a third began play in its current all-sports league.

 Valparaiso moved from the Horizon League to the Missouri Valley Conference. The Crusaders replaced Wichita State, which does not sponsor either men's or women's soccer, after that school left the MVC for the American Athletic Conference.
 The Horizon League replaced Valparaiso by recruiting IUPUI from the Summit League.
 Kansas State, a full Big 12 Conference member that started its women's soccer program in 2016 and played that season as an independent, began playing a full Big 12 schedule.

While no Division I schools added women's soccer programs for 2017, two NCAA Division II members that sponsor women's soccer announced during the 2016–17 offseason that they would upgrade their athletic programs to Division I effective in 2018.
 North Alabama, currently in the Gulf South Conference, will join the Atlantic Sun Conference.
 California Baptist will leave the Pacific West Conference for the Western Athletic Conference.

The 2017 season is the last for one Division I school in its current conference:
 North Dakota will leave the Big Sky Conference, its home since 2012, to join the Summit League in 2018.

Season Overview

Polls

Pre-season polls

Final polls

Major upsets

Conference winners and tournaments

Postseason

NCAA Tournament 

The tournament field will consist of 31 teams which have qualified by virtue of winning their conference's automatic berth as well as 33 teams chosen at-large by the NCAA Division I Women's Soccer Committee. The bracket will be announced on November 6. The tournament will begin with first-round matches played at campus sites on November 10. The tournament will conclude with the semifinals and finals played at Orlando City Stadium in Orlando, Florida on December 1 and 3.

Conference standings

See also 
 College soccer
 List of NCAA Division I women's soccer programs
 2017 in American soccer
 2017 NCAA Division I Women's Soccer Tournament
 2017 NCAA Division I men's soccer season

References 

 
NCAA, Women